Phospholipid scramblase 2, also known as Ca2+-dependent phospholipid scramblase 2, is a protein that in humans is encoded by the PLSCR2 gene.

See also 
 scramblase

References

Further reading